Mohammad Asif Rahimi (born 1959) is an Afghan politician serving as ambassador to the Netherlands. He was previously the governor of Herat Province and Minister of Agriculture. An ethnic Tajik, he was raised in Kabul, and obtained a bachelor's degree from Kabul University in 1981 before completing post-graduate studies in Management of Development Programs in 1989 at Omaha University in Nebraska, United States. Rahimi moved to Canada in 2001, and returned to Afghanistan in 2005, where he joined the Ministry of Rural Rehabilitation and Development, spearheading rural development and infrastructure regeneration. He was appointed to his current posting in October 2008 and was confirmed by the National Assembly of Afghanistan. Part of his Ministry's efforts have been focused on reducing opium production in Afghanistan, which is seen as critical to Afghanistan's development.

Asia Times reported that on November 17, 2009, two employees of the Ministry of Agriculture had the home they shared with their extended family raided by American special forces.
Asia Times reported that the surviving cousin Majibullah Qarar had reported the capture and disappearance of the other ministry employee Habib-ur-Rahman, and the shooting of two other cousins, Hamidullah and Azim. A denunciation of Habib-ur-Rahman had triggered the raid.  He was a computer expert who had traveled to Kuwait to study Computer Science, and his denunciators claimed he had been influenced by al Qaeda, while there.
Asia Times reported that the Minister of Agriculture had personally appealed to the Americans for the release of his employee.

References

External links
Official Ministry Biography Page

Living people
Agriculture ministers of Afghanistan
Kabul University alumni
University of Nebraska Omaha alumni
Ethnic Tajik people
People from Kabul
1959 births